Eva Carter Buckner (1861 – February 15, 1946) was a prominent African-American suffragist, poet, and songwriter.

Early life 
Eva Carter was born in 1861 in Washington, Iowa. Both of her parents were from Pennsylvania. As a young child, her family lived in Des Moines, Iowa, and Colorado Springs, Colorado, when she attended public school. Buckner began writing poetry as a student in Colorado Springs, where she won a poetry contest run by Mrs. J. D. Robinson, the mayor's wife.

Career

Writing 
Buckner was a well-known poet and songwriter, whose work inspired African American voices in both the suffrage movement and the civil rights movement. Buckner's poetry appeared in the Denver Post, The Colorado Springs Sun, The Western Enterprise, the Advocate, and The Daily Tribune of Los Angeles. Her songs were used in both the Colorado and California meetings of Colored Women's Clubs.

Political activity 
Buckner was a member of the Los Angeles Forum of Colored Women, and shared her poetry at their meetings. She was also active in the NAACP, working for the NAACP school committee of Los Angeles.

As former chair of suffrage for the California State Federation of Colored Women's Clubs, she was among the activists invited to comment on the death of Anna Howard Shaw in 1919. In 1922, she campaigned for Friend W. Richardson in the California gubernatorial race. In 1928, she was general chair of outreach to black women for the Herbert Hoover presidential campaign in southern California.

Personal life 
Eva Carter Buckner moved to Los Angeles around 1910. She was married to Edward Buckner; they had three children: Mabel, Eugenia, and Garrie. Eva Carter Buckner died February 15, 1946, in Los Angeles.

References

External links 

 Eva Carter Buckner, "The Man of Faith, The Man of Love" Los Angeles Evening Express (December 12, 1921): 26. A poem by Buckner, about Ferdinand Foch.
 Eva Carter Buckner, "Let's Go" The Ottawa Guardian (January 31, 1919): 2. A poem by Buckner, about African-American troops in World War I.
Eva Carter Buckner, "Onward" Denver Statesman (June 8, 1906): 15. A song written by Buckner, sung by the Colorado Federation of Colored Women's Clubs at their 1906 meeting.

1861 births
1946 deaths
People from Washington, Iowa
African-American suffragists
American suffragists
African-American poets
African-American songwriters
Songwriters from Iowa
Writers from Iowa
19th-century American women writers
20th-century American women writers
American women songwriters
19th-century American poets
20th-century American poets
African-American women musicians
20th-century African-American women writers
20th-century African-American writers
19th-century African-American women